Jesse Mims (born August 27, 1948) is a former Canadian football player who played for the Calgary Stampeders. He won the Grey Cup with Calgary in 1971. He played college football at New Mexico State University.

References

1948 births
Living people
Calgary Stampeders players
Detroit Wheels players
Portland Storm players
New Mexico State Aggies football players
American football running backs
Canadian football running backs
Sportspeople from Alameda, California
Players of American football from California
American players of Canadian football